Bertin Tokéné (born 10 May 1975 in Douala, Cameroon) is a Cameroonian-Belgian football defender. He currently plays for R.J.S. Heppignies-Lambusart-Fleurus.

External links

1975 births
Living people
Cameroonian footballers
Association football defenders
Belgian people of Cameroonian descent
R. Charleroi S.C. players
Grenoble Foot 38 players
Stade Brestois 29 players
Tours FC players
Black Belgian sportspeople